Sherba Ridge (‘Rid Sherba’ \'rid 'sher-ba\ is the ice-covered ridge extending 13 km in southeast-northwest direction and 6 km wide, with a northern height rising to 2096 m, central one rising to 2099 and southern to 2143 m in the west foothills of Avery Plateau on Loubet Coast in Graham Land, Antarctica.  It has steep and partly ice-free southwest, north and east slopes, and surmounts Widdowson Glacier to the southwest, Darbel Bay to the northwest, and Drummond Glacier to the northeast and east.

The ridge is named after the locality of Sherba in eastern Balkan Mountains.

Location
British mapping in 1976.

Maps
British Antarctic Territory. Scale 1:200000 topographic map. DOS 610 Series, Sheet W 66 64. Directorate of Overseas Surveys, Tolworth, UK, 1976.
 Antarctic Digital Database (ADD). Scale 1:250000 topographic map of Antarctica. Scientific Committee on Antarctic Research (SCAR). Since 1993, regularly upgraded and updated.

Notes

References
 Bulgarian Antarctic Gazetteer. Antarctic Place-names Commission. (details in Bulgarian, basic data in English)
 Sherba Ridge. SCAR Composite Gazetteer of Antarctica

External links
 Sherba Ridge. Copernix satellite image

Mountains of Graham Land
Bulgaria and the Antarctic
Loubet Coast